Marada is a desert oasis in the Al Wahat District, Cyrenaica region, in northeastern Libya.

References

External links
Satellite map at Maplandia.com

Populated places in Al Wahat District
Oases of Libya
Cyrenaica
Baladiyat of Libya